In the field of pharmacology, diphemanil metilsulfate also known as diphemanil methylsulfate is an antimuscarinic (an agent that blocks the action of the natural neurotransmitter acetylcholine).

References

Muscarinic antagonists
Quaternary ammonium compounds
Piperidines